Marin Civic Center station is a Sonoma–Marin Area Rail Transit station in San Rafael, California, located adjacent to the Marin County Civic Center.

History
BART proposed a train station near the current location as part of the Marin Line in a report sent to the approving counties in 1961. Marin's exit from the Bay Area Rapid Transit District halted these plans.

The current station opened to preview service on June 29, 2017; full commuter service commenced on August 25, 2017.

References

External links

SMART - Marin Civic Center

Buildings and structures in San Rafael, California
Railway stations in the United States opened in 2017
2017 establishments in California
Sonoma-Marin Area Rail Transit stations in Marin County
San Francisco Bay Trail